TCSD may refer to:
 Tanana City School District - Tanana, Alaska
 Terlingua Common School District - Brewster County, Texas